Tony McManus (born 14 April 1957) is a former Gaelic footballer from County Roscommon, Ireland. He played with the Roscommon intercounty team from the 1970s until the 1990s. He had much success winning Connacht Senior Football Championships in 1977, 1978, 1979, 1980, 1990, 1991, a National League Title in 1979, an All-Ireland Under-21 Football Championship in 1978, he also played in the All-Ireland Senior Football Championship final in 1980 when Roscommon lost out to Kerry, he also won an All Star Award in 1989.

He had much success at club level also with Clann na nGael. He won 12 Roscommon Senior Football Championship medals in 1976-77, 1979, 1981–82, 1984–91, he won 7 Connacht Senior Club Football Championship medals in 1982, 1984, 1985, 1986, 1987, 1988, 1989.

He also won 3 Sigerson Cup medals with UCD in 1977, 1978 and 1979 as captain.

In May 2020, the Irish Independent named McManus as one of the "dozens of brilliant players" who narrowly missed selection for its "Top 20 footballers in Ireland over the past 50 years".

References

1957 births
Living people
Alumni of University College Dublin
Clan na Gael (Roscommon) Gaelic footballers
Roscommon inter-county Gaelic footballers
UCD Gaelic footballers